Chan Yung-jan and Abigail Spears were the defending champions, but did not participate that year.
Julia Görges and Polona Hercog defeated Natalie Grandin and Vladimíra Uhlířová in the final, 6–3, 6–4.

Seeds

Draw

Draw

External links
 Main Draw

Korea Open (tennis)
Korea Open - Doubles